Jambusar is one of the 182 Legislative Assembly constituencies of Gujarat state in India. It is part of Bharuch district.

List of segments
This assembly seat represents the following segments,

 Jambusar Taluka
 Amod Taluka

Members of Legislative Assembly
2007 - Kirankumar Makwana, Indian National Congress
2012 - Chhatrasinh Mori, Bharatiya Janata Party

Election results

2022

2017

2012

See also
 List of constituencies of Gujarat Legislative Assembly
 Gujarat Legislative Assembly

References

External links
 

Assembly constituencies of Gujarat
Bharuch district